is the fifth studio album by Miyavi. It was released on September 13, 2006.  It was produced by Hideki Tsutsumi and reached number 25 on the weekly Oricon Style chart.

Track listing

References

Shoxx, October 2006 "【雅-みやびうた-歌】～独奏～、Around the World、Now&Then"
www.barks.jp 雅が新たなスタイルを表現する『雅-みやびうた-歌 ～独奏～』特集
www.barks.jp 『雅-みやびうた-歌 ～独奏～』インタヴュー
cdjournal.com 雅-みやびうた-歌～独奏～ Review
discas.net
www.victormusicarts.jp
www.oricon.co.jp

2006 albums
Miyavi albums